95 Express may refer to:
95 Express (Miami), a tolled express roadway and associated bus service along Interstate 95
95 Express Lanes (Northern Virginia), a tolled reversible express roadway along Interstate 95
I-95 Express Toll Lanes (Baltimore), a tolled express roadway along Interstate 95